City Football Group Limited (CFG) is a holding company that administers association football clubs. The group is owned by three organisations; of which 81% is majority owned by Newton Investment and Development LLC, 18% by the American firm Silver Lake and 1% by Chinese firms China Media Capital and CITIC Capital.

The group derives its name from Manchester City F.C., its flagship football club and acts as the club's parent company. CFG also owns stakes in clubs in the United States, Australia, India, Japan, Spain, Brazil, Uruguay, China, Belgium, France and Italy.

History 

Founded in 2013, City Football Group is the realisation of a business vision by former Barcelona Economy Vice President Ferran Soriano. Soriano first conceived of the ideal of a global football entity while at the Catalan club, beginning with the creation of Barca-branded overseas academies. Soriano contacted Major League Soccer Commissioner Don Garber about creating a Barcelona-branded MLS franchise and the pair progressed as far as looking into several locations to place the team, but ultimately these plans were curtailed when Soriano and seven other members of Barcelona's board chose to resign in protest of then-President Joan Laporta's leadership.

After a four-year break from football management, Soriano was hired in late 2012 to replace Garry Cook as CEO of Manchester City following the latter's resignation. Soriano revived his ambitions of creating a global football business entity, beginning by resuming dialogues with Garber. Their discussions resulted in the announcement of New York City FC as MLS' 20th expansion side less than one year later in May 2013. In the process of managing the creation of a second football team City Football Group was created, designed to be the holding company to which both Manchester City and NYCFC belonged. CFG expanded at the start of 2014 when it partnered with Rugby league side Melbourne Storm to acquire a controlling stake in A-League franchise Melbourne Heart for 12 million Australian dollars. The club would subsequently be rebranded to Melbourne City FC and their badge changed as part of CFG's early attempts to synergise their investments with Manchester City as a brand, and the club's colours would slowly be changed to sky blue with their red-and-white stripes retained as away colours.

In the weeks following their purchase of Melbourne City, CFG indicated their intentions of investing in women's football by rebranding Manchester City's female affiliate as Manchester City Women's Football Club and successfully lobbied for the team to be added to the top tier of the FA Women's Super League, promising to invest in women's football on a scale never before seen in England. Later the following year CFG would grow again with the purchase of a 20% in Japanese side Yokohama F Marinos, the traditional company team of group sponsor Nissan.

In April 2017, after a near three-year pause in its expansion, City Football Group announced the Uruguayan second-tier side Club Atletico Torque, who would later be renamed Montevideo City Torque. Several months later Torque would be followed in by Spanish second division club Girona, a club with ownership links to incumbent Manchester City manager Pep Guardiola.

2019 saw the beginning of an increase in CFG's activity. The purchase of Chinese third division club Sichuan Jiuniu was followed towards the end of the year by a second venture in Asia, when the group bought a controlling stake in Indian Super League franchise Mumbai City. 2020 similarly would see two club purchases in European football, first of Lommel of Belgium and then of Troyes of France, with both moves notably seeing the purchased clubs rescued from financial difficulties and linked to the economic damages wrought by the COVID-19 pandemic. In the same year they would also expand their business interests by taking sole control of US-based five-a-side football business Goals Soccer Centers, a business they had previously invested in, following the near-collapse of the company's owners due to an internal scandal.

In March 2022, Dutch second-tier side NAC Breda announced that following an investigation into the best bidders to sell the club's shares, the shareholders of the club had agreed to a sale to CFG. In response, the club's fans held protests both in Breda and also Manchester and Lommel. A month later, a group of shareholders with key voting rights announced that in light of the backlash they had elected instead to sell their shares to a local consortium.

Principles and interests 
Since its inception, commenters have drawn parallels between City Football Group and Ferran Soriano's ideas spelled out in his 2011 book Goal: The Ball Doesn't Go In By Chance, in which Soriano remarked that the natural evolution of club brands was to expand globally, and that doing so could include the creation of franchise clubs in foreign leagues. His book continued to expound upon the notion that appealing to foreign fans who had no strongly-ingrained non-domestic allegiances was an important facet of business growth of sporting brands, and that giving those fans a domestic side to support alongside and affiliated to their European club could encourage more loyalty from them. This idea would be termed "Disneyfication" by Professor Simon Chadwick, an expert in Eurasian sport at Emlyon Business School and himself a confidant of Soriano.

Branding and player development 
Early growth in the group focused on teams sharing a common identity and an associated brand, which aligned with the traditional identity of Manchester City and was viewed as a key way of helping the Manchester club build up its foreign support. This also matched Soriano's well-reported interest in placing City Football Group as a lynchpin in the opening-up of national markets in which association football has not previously been able to secure a strong presence, through the operation of and investment in franchises in those countries.

The first entity to join CFG was the newly created New York City FC, with the club announcing that they would sport the familiar sky blue kit with white shorts which Manchester City have traditionally been associated with, and the rebranded Melbourne City (originally named Melbourne Heart) similarly switched to sky blue after defeating challenges from fellow A-League club Sydney FC. With the purchase of Mumbai City and the renaming of Club Atletico Torque to Montevideo City Torque, five teams in the group feature the word City in their name, and similarly all five wear sky blue kits. NYCFC's circular badge style would also be mimicked by Manchester City, Melbourne City and Torque. Following from these changes it was reported that the company's aim was to own a team on each continent with the "City" brand in its name.

Developments within Manchester City's academy would ultimately lead to a shift in strategy and focus of the group. Efforts to continue their success in bringing through youth talent led to the buying of promising players in the early teenage years, many of whom would go on to be sold for a large profit. This prompted Soriano and CFG's executive management to change their ambitions to put more emphasis on purchasing smaller clubs in strong existing football markets, with the intention of turning them into specialists centres for acquiring and training future stars from their local areas. As a result, the emphasis on clubs sharing kit colours and having discernibly similar badges and names has been reduced. Outside of Manchester, the European clubs within CFG in particular have not seen any change to their identities beyond the use of sky blue as a change strip colour in Girona. Similar is true of Asian clubs Yokohama F. Marinos and Sichuan Jiuniu.

Collaboration between clubs 
One of the core philosophies of City Football Group since its inception has been the mutual supporting of clubs through combined scouting and player sharing. While virtually all large European clubs operate an international scouting network, financial demands make it impossible to access local knowledge in foreign countries to the same extent as a domestic club could. CFG clubs therefore provide invaluable services to each other by using their own local scouting networks to share information on players between clubs. With their combined knowledge, the group advertises that it has extensive information on half a million players around the world. Possessing such a network then allows the local clubs to sign players early in their development, safe in the knowledge that the range of clubs CFG owns means that they can be placed at any of a number of sides as their development continues and the need for other challenges arises. The player-sharing element of the City network was first advertised with the high-profile transfer of Aaron Mooy from Melbourne City to Manchester City – an early case of utilising the network to support revenue generation – with the 2020–21 season seeing Manchester City send 14 foreign-sourced youth players out on loan, predominantly to other group clubs.

In addition to internal player movements, CFG has also sought to foster movements of coaching staff within their network also; among the most notable relocations are French manager Eric Mombaerts, who has worked with Yokohama F. Marinos, Melbourne City and Troyes, Manchester City Women manager Nick Cushing transferring to New York and English coach Liam Manning transferring from the NYCFC academy to take over management of Lommel's first team.

The second of CFG's core philosophies regarding club collaboration is on- and off-pitch technical information sharing. Based around the tactics of Manchester City manager Pep Guardiola – long coveted for the Manchester job by Ferran Soriano and Txiki Begiristain after their experience working with him in Barcelona – all of City Football Group's clubs are given access to extensive databases of Manchester City's tactics and coaching methods, enabling them all to follow the group directive to use the same style of football, a style occasionally referred to as the City Way. This synergy of tactical style extends beyond their first teams to the academies and women's sections. In addition to this, the clubs also share other information, such as medical, performance monitoring and player management.

Investment in women's football 
Four of City Football Group's ten clubs sport women's teams, with Montevideo City Torque expected to launch a women's team in 2021 and New York City FC having previously held discussions about an affiliation with Sky Blue FC in 2014. In both Manchester and Melbourne, CFG (re)launched new women's sides in 2014 and 2015, promising to invest in women's football in unprecedent ways. In both cities the women's teams would ultimately be given bespoke facilities which, in contrast to the standard for football clubs, shared training locations with their affiliated men's teams. Similarly, both cities would see returns for their investment, with Manchester City Women repeatedly finishing amongst the top two and winning a series of domestic trophies while Melbourne City's unprecedented investment in Australian women's football – an area which had previously been underfunded and largely forgotten in the country – earned the side plaudits for their forward-thinking and would see their female side crowned Grand Final winners four times in five seasons.

Esports 
Looking to capitalise on the growth of esports and for City Football Group to be seen as always being at the forefront of innovation, CFG made their first venture into digital gaming in June 2016 when they signed Kieran "Kez" Brown to represent Manchester City at FIFA tournaments and fan events as well as to make digital content for their social media profiles.

Over the following years, CFG expanded their esports footprint as most of their clubs signed players to represent them in FIFA tournaments, with most clubs keeping one PlayStation player and one Xbox player on their books to represent them at all times. By early 2021, CFG would have a total of 16 professional esports players across their various clubs. In 2021, Manchester City became the first CFG club to expand beyond FIFA when they signed Aiden "Threats" Mong to represent them in Fortnite tournaments. Unlike the other CFG teams, Manchester City would also go on to create separate esports teams in China and South Korea to compete in Asia-localised tournaments.

In addition to having their own esports players, CFG have also collaborated with existing teams. In 2019 Manchester City announced a partnership with FaZe Clan which would see the two run various esports competitions and merchandising lines, as well as allowing City's and FaZe's FIFA players to share facilities and train together. In 2022, CFG announced that it was sponsoring Blue United eFC, in a move which would see Blue United wear CFG-style sky blue shirts at competitive events.

CFG owned clubs

Manchester City F.C. 

Manchester City trace their origins back to 1880, taking their present name in the year 1894. The club was one of the founding members of the Football League Second Division in 1892 and first gained promotion to the top division of English football in 1899, in the process becoming the first team in history to be promoted via automatic promotion. They are ranked as one of the top ten clubs in England for most seasons spent in the English top flight, and top five for most major honours won. Their first trophy came in the 1904 FA Cup Final; in total, at the point of their acquisition by City Football Group, they had won two top flight league titles, four FA Cups, two League Cups, one UEFA Cup Winners' Cup and three FA Community Shields.

After its takeover, Manchester City launched into a complete overhaul of all departments, intent on rising to the top as fast as possible. On the pitch, the following seasons saw the team replaced under the management of Mark Hughes and then a second time under Roberto Mancini as the lobbying of established UEFA Champions League clubs in the Premier League forced the Manchester team to act quickly in order to achieve Champions League status before the newly implemented Financial Fair Play Regulations made it unviable for teams to spend outside of their earnings in an attempt to move up the table. Meanwhile, off the pitch City spent £10 million on revamping their Platt Lane academy base as they formulated plans to produce a £100m training and academy facility on land opposite their stadium, studying training facilities around the world in an attempt to create the world's foremost development in its field. This came in conjunction with the announcement in 2014 that they had received planning permission to increase their stadium capacity to over 62,000, making it the second largest club stadium in England. Further investment came in the field of fan engagement, where City committed themselves to a policy of winning the global popularity contest with a mass display of social media. Since the start of the 2016–17 season, Manchester City have been coached by former FC Barcelona player and coach and FC Bayern Munich coach Pep Guardiola.

Under City Football Group, Manchester City Football Club have lifted the 2010–11 FA Cup, 2011–12 Premier League, 2012 FA Community Shield, 2013–14 Football League Cup, 2013–14 Premier League, 2015–16 Football League Cup, 2017–18 EFL Cup, 2017–18 Premier League, 2018 FA Community Shield, 2018–19 EFL Cup, 2018–19 Premier League, 2018–19 FA Cup, 2019 FA Community Shield, 2019–20 EFL Cup, 2020–21 EFL Cup, 2020–21 Premier League and 2021–22 Premier League. City's best European result in that timespan was a final in the 2020–21 UEFA Champions League.

In April 2022, a report from Der Spiegel, based on leaked internal documents, claimed that the Abu Dhabi owners had previously made payments into the club disguised as sponsorship payments by Emirati companies like Etihad and Etisalat (the same claim that the club had successfully defended at CAS in 2020); Sheikh Mansour's Abu Dhabi United Group had allegedly indirectly paid for underage players to sign with the club; and that the club had allegedly used a fictitious contract between Roberto Mancini and Mansour's Al Jazira Club to pay large compensation fees to the former manager, in addition to his salary. The three cases were under investigation by the Premier League for the last three years. In response the club dismissed these claims as untrue, where sources close to the club said the report was a continuation of an “orchestrated campaign” and part of “an endless attempt to damage us”.

Manchester City Women 

Although Manchester City Women had existed since 1988 (previously under the name Manchester City Ladies F.C.) they existed solely as an external affiliate of the club until August 2012, with few shared resources and with CFG enjoying no control over the club's management. Four years after the purchase of Manchester City, an agreement was signed in which the affiliated women's team would come under full control of Manchester City and would effectively become a department of the same organisation.

Shortly after taking control of the club, the side was relaunched as Manchester City Women's Football Club and applied successfully to join the top tier of English women's football – the recently created FA Women's Super League. When the new Manchester City training ground was constructed it was specifically designed to include the women's team as equal partners, and the encouragement of the women's team to have access to the same sports science and analysts as the men's teams was considered pioneering at the time. They won their first major in the 2014 FA WSL Cup, and they have become one of the most successful sides in the professional era of women's football in England, with a total of one league title, three Women's FA Cups and four FA WSL Cups.

New York City FC 

Founded in 2013, New York City FC joined the American Major League Soccer as the 20th expansion team; their first season of actual competition was in 2015, alongside Orlando City SC. To date they are the only team built from scratch by City Football Group. CFG own 80% of NYCFC, with the remaining 20% owned by Yankee Global Enterprises, the parent company of the New York Yankees baseball club, at whose home stadium they play their matches. The club's first employee was former Manchester City and US national team player Claudio Reyna, who was appointed as Director of Football and undertook much of the initial building of the club before moving on in 2019.

Building on their work in Manchester, City Football Group announced the creation of a bespoke training facility, using the name "City Football Academy" as would become standard across the group, in Orangeburg, New York, just outside of the city limits: it opened in 2018. New York City FC's first season results were modest, but since their second season they have made the MLS Cup Playoffs in every season. They lifted the MLS Cup for the first time in 2021.

New York City FC II 

In late 2021, MLS announced the creation of a new division which the USSF recognised as a third-tier league in the US football league pyramid. NYCFC were announced to be one of the 21 clubs which would enter it as a founder-member. To this end, they launched a development team, called New York City FC II (frequently referred to as NYCFC II or NYCFC2).

Melbourne City FC 

One of seven expansion sides in the A-League Men, Melbourne City originally joined their league as a new franchise in 2010 under the name of Melbourne Heart. In so doing, they became the first club to join the league in a city where the A-League already had a presence, instantly creating a rivalry with founder member Melbourne Victory in what is now known as the Melbourne derby. Although the Heart won the first Melbourne derby their early performances in the league were poor, qualifying for the playoffs only once in the first four seasons and finishing in last place in the 2013–14 season.

City Football Group's purchase of Melbourne Heart was announced on 23 January 2014, in a deal worked out with a consortium of businessmen related to local rugby league club Melbourne Storm. Under the new ownership, the Heart changed its name to Melbourne City in June of the same year, with the club switching to sky blue jerseys in 2017 – their previous red and white stripes would be retained as their away colours, however. In 2015 they opened a new City Football Academy facility at La Trobe University based on the designs and principles of the Manchester training ground of the same name, and began construction of a larger base in the south of the city in 2021. In 2016 the club won their first major honour by beating Sydney FC in the final of the Australia Cup (then known as the FFA Cup), while they claimed their first league trophies by winning both the A-League Premier's Plate and the A-League Champions Trophy in 2021.

Melbourne City Youth 

As part of the expansion of the National Premier Leagues Victoria 1 (now known as NPL Victoria 2), Melbourne City had an application accepted to field a team based around their now-defunct Youth side in the competition along with five additional new entrants. On 6 December 2014 they announced the creation of their NPL team, which began competition in the 2015 season.

Although Melbourne City have seen much success in the junior age categories they have not repeated this at the professional level, with no trophy wins. In 2019, when NPL Victoria 2 was split in half to create a new, lower, third tier NPL division, Melbourne City were one of the teams relegated to the lower level.

Melbourne City Women 

Following the success of their investment in Manchester City's women's team, CFG announced their continued support of women's football with the creation of a women's department in Melbourne in 2015 which was accepted as an expansion team in the W-League.

Since its inception the W-League had seen low levels of financial support from clubs into their female sides, with teams rarely spending even half of their budget cap. In this environment, Melbourne City were able to sweep the board in their first season, going undefeated all season to win both the league and the playoff trophies and setting a number of records. In total, Melbourne City have won the Premiership twice (in 2015–16 and 2019–20) and the championship four times (in 2016, 2017, 2018 and 2020).

Yokohama F. Marinos 

As with many clubs in Japan, Yokohama F. Marinos were founded as a factory team of car manufacturing giant Nissan, and originally played under the name Nissan Motors F.C. Though the club changed its name to Yokohama Marinos when they turned professional in 1993, throughout their history they have remainder under Nissan's majority ownership. In 1999 the club merged with local rivals Yokohama Flugels after the Flugels went into insolvancy – the combination of the two teams resulted in the current name Yokohama F. Marinos. Over their history they have been one of Japan's more successful clubs, winning the Japanese top division league title on six occasions along with twelve domestic cups and two continental trophies.

On 20 May 2014, it was announced that City Football Group had invested in a minority share of Yokohama F. Marinos, creating a partnership with both the football club and car manufacturer Nissan. Through their contacts in the game, CFG would bring several managers in succession to Yokohama. Australian Ange Postecoglou would be the most successful, winning the 2019 J1 League, the club's first league title for 15 seasons. At the same time, pundits noted that Yokohama's switch to playing a CFG-inspired possession game had influenced the way that football was played in Japan, with many other teams copying their style.

Montevideo City Torque 

Montevideo City Torque were first created as Club Atlético Torque in 2007. The club adopted the moniker Torque as one of its founders was an electromechanic, and collectively the founders liked the concept of torque as a relationship between power and movement. Starting from the third tier – at that time the lowest level of the Uruguayan football league system – the club made steady progress, earning promotion to the Segunda División in 2011 achieving finishes in the top half of the Segunda División table by 2015.

On 5 April 2017, CFG announced that it had acquired Club Atletico Torque, a club in Montevideo currently playing in the Uruguayan Primera División. That season, the club won the Segunda División by nine points, being promoted to the Primera División for the first time. Though they came close to winning the Torneo Intermedio – which would have qualified them for the Copa Sudamericana – they would at the end of the season fall foul of the Primera División relegation rules, which saw the bottom three teams relegated based on a two-year rolling average of points per game. Nevertheless, they would win the Segunda División again in 2019 to return to the top flight again. In 2020 the club would also rename itself to Montevideo City Torque and alter the club badge, simultaneously announcing the creation of a training facility and academy system intended to be one of the best in South America.

Montevideo City Torque Femenino 

In 2021 Montevideo City Torque announced that they were creating a women's team, borne from City Football Group's desire to support and grow women's football; they recruited both a senior team and an under-19 side from a group of 100 trialists. The team was formed quickly enough to contest in the 2021 season of the Campeonato Femenino B, the second tier of women's football in Uruguay. In their first season they won all seven of their First Phase games but performed less well in the Promotion Phase, missing out on the chance to ascend to the top division at the first attempt.

Girona 

On 23 August 2017, it was announced that the City Football Group had acquired 44.3% of La Liga side Girona. Another 44.3% was held by the Girona Football Group, led by Pere Guardiola, brother of Manchester City manager Pep Guardiola. Girona had previously been loaned a number of players by Manchester City while they were in the Segunda División, in what was seen by some as an attempt to attract Pep Guardiola to Manchester City. In August 2018, Girona had two loanees, both 21 years old, from Manchester City.

Girona B 

In line with the Spanish standard of major teams operating B-teams as development squads for younger players, Girona owns a subsidiary team named simply Girona B, following the incorporation in 2011 of the formerly independent side CF Riudellots. At the time of the purchase of Girona by CFG, the club operated in the Segona Catalana division, the sixth level of football in Spain. As an official B-team Girona B is ineligible for promotion to a higher division than any other Girona-affiliated side above them in the leagues. Nor is it eligible to play in any cup competition in which Girona themselves already compete.

Girona additionally operated a primary B-team – CF Peralada-Girona B – although this team was merely in partnership with Girona and neither Girona nor CFG had any ownership stake in the club. In 2019, the affiliation with Peralada was terminated as they were relegated to the Tercera División.

Girona FC Femení A 

Though they had operated a women's side since 2017, Girona Femení A only came into being in 2020, when Girona purchased the women's section of local club Sant Pere Pescador, renaming them to match the club's identity.

Girona FC Femení B 

Although Girona FC operated a senior women's team for a number of years, financial constraints had forced them to cease operations at the senior level in 2013 and by 2017 the Catalan club operated just 3 junior teams with a total of 41 youth players in their system. Barely two months before CFG bought into the ownership of Girona FC, the club announced an expansion of its female set-up, including the restoration of the senior women's team, to start competing in the fifth tier of women's football in Spain.

Sichuan Jiuniu 

On 20 February 2019, it was announced that the City Football Group as well as UBTECH and China Sports Capital had acquired Sichuan Jiuniu F.C.

Mumbai City FC 

City Football Group was announced as majority stakeholder of Mumbai City on Thursday 28 November 2019 after acquiring 65% of the club. Mumbai City FC is a professional football club based in Mumbai, competing in the Indian Super League. Since CFG’s takeover of Mumbai City, the club saw its initial success by the premiership and championship in a single season in 2020-21.

Mumbai City FC Reserves 

Mumbai City FC Reserves were announced to be competing for the first time in the I-League 2nd Division, the third tier of Indian football.

Lommel SK 

City Football Group was announced as majority stakeholder of Lommel SK on Monday 11 May 2020 acquiring the majority (unspecified) of the shares of the club. Lommel S.K. is a professional football club based in Lommel, competing in the Belgian First Division B (second tier).

ES Troyes AC 

On 3 September 2020, City Football Group announced that they had purchased the shares of the former owner of Ligue 2 club Troyes AC Daniel Masoni, making them the majority shareholder of the Ligue 2 French club. The club won the championship and was promoted to Ligue 1 at the end of the 2020–2021 season.

ES Troyes AC Reserves 

The development side of Troyes AC, known variously as Troyes AC Reserves and Troyes AC 2, play in Group F (Grand Est) of the Championnat National 3, the fifth tier of the French football league system.

ES Troyes ACC Féminine 

ESTAC Troyes are represented in the women's game by Troyes AC Féminine, a senior side who compete in Grand Est Regional 1 (the third tier of women's football in France), having been denied promotion to Division 2 Féminine by the early closing of the 2019–20 season due to the COVID-19 pandemic.

Palermo 

In July 2022, CFG acquired a 80% majority stake of Italian Serie B club Palermo.

Esporte Clube Bahia 

On December 3, 2022, City Football Group  acquired 90% of Esporte Clube Bahia. The deal is expected to be finalised by early 2023.

Honours achieved under CFG ownership 
The following senior-level trophies have been won by City Football Group teams while under the ownership and control of the group. Trophies won before the inclusion in the City Football Group are not listed in this section:

List by club

Girona 
Segunda División
  Play-off Winners (1): 2021–22
Supercopa de Catalunya
  Winners (1): 2019

Girona B 
Primera Catalana
 Winners (1): 2019–20
Segona Catalana
 Winners (1): 2017–18

Manchester City 
Premier League
 Winners (6): 2011–12, 2013–14, 2017–18, 2018–19, 2020–21, 2021–22
FA Cup
 Winners (2): 2010–11, 2018–19
EFL Cup
 Winners (6): 2013–14, 2015–16, 2017–18, 2018–19, 2019–20, 2020–21
FA Community Shield
 Winners (3): 2012, 2018, 2019

Manchester City Women 
 FA WSL 1:
 Winners (1): 2016
 FA Women's Cup:
 Winners (3): 2016–17, 2018–19, 2019–20
 FA WSL Continental Cup:
 Winners (4): 2014, 2016, 2018–19, 2021–22

Melbourne City 
 A-League Club Championship
 Winners (1) : 2021–22
 A-League
 A-League champions (1): 2020–21
 A-League premiers (2): 2020–21, 2021–22
 FFA Cup
 Winners (1): 2016

Melbourne City Women 
 A-League Women:
 W-League champions (4): 2015–16, 2016–17, 2017–18, 2019–20
 W-League premiers (2): 2015–16, 2019–20

Montevideo City Torque 
 Segunda División
  Winners (2): 2017, 2019

Montevideo City Torque Femenino 
 Segunda Division 
 Winners (1): 2022
 Torneo Segunda Division Apertura
 Winners (1): 2022
 Torneo Segunda Division Clausura
 Winners (1): 2022

Mumbai City 
 Indian Super League
 Champions (1): 2020–21
 Premiers (2): 2020–21, 2022–23

 New York City 
 Campeones Cup Winners (1): 2022MLS Cup Winners (1): 2021
 Eastern Conference (Playoff) Title Winners: 2021

 Troyes 
 Ligue 2 Winners (1): 2020–21

 Yokohama F. Marinos 
 J1 League Winners (2): 2019, 2022Japanese Super CupWinners (1): 2023

 Table of honours won 

1 Includes lower league titles plus any cups not available to top division clubs, but does not include cups considered non-competitive for statistics purposes (such as pre-season competitions or local FA tournaments habitually contested by reserve sides).
2 Includes titles won while under control of City Football Group personnel, but before the creation of the company itself.
3 Girona were acquired by CFG in 2017 and have operated a women's team for the whole of their time in CFG. However, the Femení A team only came into existence in 2020 when local team FC Sant Pere Pescador sold their women's team to Girona, allowing Girona to operate a women's team at a more professional level.
4 Although MCWFC have been affiliated to Manchester City since their creation in the 1980s, they only came under CFG control when the two clubs merged in 2014.
5 Although the EDS have operated as Manchester City's reserve team for considerably longer than CFG have owned the club, they only began competing in a senior competition in 2017–18 when they were given a place in the EFL Trophy.
6 In the 2019–20 season, ISL teams were invited to enter reserve teams into the I-League 2nd Division, a second-tier competition. The season was cut short in March 2020 due to the COVID-19 pandemic and in subsequent seasons reserve teams were not eligible to participate.

 Intra-Group matches 
Though City Football Group has existed for a number of years, competing schedules and priorities have limited the number of occasions on which CFG teams have been able to contest matches against each other. The following record lists the games played between CFG teams while both have been under common ownership:

 CFG partner clubs 
 Club Bolivar 

It was announced on 12 January 2021 that Club Bolivar had become the first partner club for the group.  Club Bolivar is the most successful Bolivian club having won 29 domestic titles since it was founded in La Paz on 12 April 1925.  The owner of the club Marcelo Claure is also part of the ownership group of Inter Miami CF alongside David Beckham as well as being COO of SoftBank Group with Masayoshi Son (CEO of Softbank) as well as Jorge Mas and Jose Mas from MasTec respectively.Honours after partnership :'División de Fútbol Profesional (1): 2022-A

 Vannes OC 

It was announced on 17 February 2021 that French fourth tier side Vannes had become the latest partner club for the group. The two club were already linked after Vannes' President Maxime Ray had joined CFG to become a minority shareholder in Troyes AC as part of the 2020 purchase, though he agreed to have no operational role at Troyes as part of the takeover.

 Geylang International FC 

It was announced on 1 February 2023 that Singapore Premier League club Geylang International had become the first southeast asian partner club for the group. The agreement is set to be an initial, highly targeted collaboration between both entities with the potential to evolve into a broader, more comprehensive strategic partnership in the future.

 Businesses 
 Goals Soccer Centers 
On 25 July 2017, City Football Group signed a joint venture partnership with Goals Soccer Centres, a 5-a-side football pitch operator, to invest capital into the US operations of the company in order to expand across North America. On 3 February 2020, CFG purchased the remaining 50% to take full ownership of the joint venture – operating under the Americanised name Goals Soccer Centers'' – following the near-collapse of their partner as a result of historic fraud allegations.

See also 
 Manchester City F.C. ownership and finances

References 

 
Holding companies established in 2014
Companies based in Manchester
2014 establishments in England
British companies established in 2014
Sports holding companies
Sports companies of the United Kingdom